ESPN Final Round Golf 2002 is a golf video game developed and published by Konami. It was released in North America on August 28, 2001. In Europe it was known as ESPN Final Round Golf. The game is a facelift version of the Japanese GBA title Golf Master: Japan Golf Tour which is identical except for the player list which in the Japanese version consisted mostly of Japanese tour players.

Reception

The game received above-average reviews according to the review aggregation website Metacritic. In Japan, Famitsu gave it a score of 25 out of 40.

See also
Ultra Golf
Konami's Open Golf Championship

References

External links
 

2001 video games
ESPN video games
Game Boy Advance games
Game Boy Advance-only games
Golf video games
Konami games
Video games developed in Japan